The 21st Annual Black Reel Awards ceremony, presented by the Foundation for the Augmentation of African-Americans in Film (FAAAF) and honoring the best films of 2020, took place on April 11, 2021. During the ceremony, FAAAF presented the Black Reel Awards in 23 categories. The film nominations were announced on February 18, 2021 and led by One Night in Miami... with 15 nominations.

Amazon Studios' 'One Night in Miami...' was the big winner, winning 5 wins including Outstanding Director for Regina King, Outstanding Ensemble and Outstanding Original Song for "Speak Now". King became the third woman behind Gina Prince-Bythewood & Ava DuVernay to win Outstanding Director. Judas and the Black Messiah took home 3 prizes including Outstanding Film, Outstanding Supporting Actor for Daniel Kaluuya & Outstanding Supporting Actress for Dominique Fishback. The producing team of Ryan Coogler, Shaka King and Charles D. King became the first all-Black producing team to win Outstanding Film in Black Reel Award history. In addition, Kaluuya joined Lupita Nyong'o as only the second person and first male to win the Black Reel Award "Triple-Crown" for Lead, Supporting and Breakthrough categories. 

 Ma Rainey's Black Bottom 2 wins were historic as Chadwick Boseman win for Outstanding Actor became the first posthumously winner, while Viola Davis win for Outstanding Actress tied her for the most wins in that category with 2. Other big winners included The Forty-Year-Old Version, Jingle Jangle: A Christmas Journey & Soul 

The 5th Annual Black Reel Awards for Television was presented on August 11, 2021. The nominations were announced on June 17, 2021.

Film winners and nominees

Films with multiple nominations and awards

Television winners and nominees

Comedy

Drama

Television Movies/Limited Series

Other categories

Television Movies/Limited Series

References

Black Reel Awards
2020 film awards
2020 in American cinema
2020 awards in the United States